Komsomolskaya was a Soviet Antarctic inland research station founded in 1957 in Queen Mary Land, in eastern Antarctica. It was a year-round station till 1959, then used as a seasonal outpost till 1962 when it was shut down permanently. Nonetheless it is still used as a fuel storage stop for supply caravans en route from Mirny Station to Vostok Station.

Estonian writer Juhan Smuul spent a week in Komsomolskaya in 1958 and described the life and working there in his book Antarctica Ahoy!: The Ice Book, originally published in 1960 as Jäine raamat.

See also
 List of Antarctic research stations
 List of Antarctic field camps

References

Outposts of Antarctica
Russia and the Antarctic
Outposts of Queen Mary Land
Soviet Union and the Antarctic
1957 establishments in Antarctica
1962 disestablishments in Antarctica